Jack Boyle (born 1990) is a footballer from Jersey who plays as a winger for Jersey Bulls in the Combined Counties Football League Division One.

Club career
After trialling with Oldham Athletic in February 2008, Boyle signed a six-month contract with Southampton in November 2008. He left the club in May 2010, following injury, and signed for Salisbury City in January 2011. After playing back in Jersey for Jersey Scottish, Boyle signed for Scottish club Airdrie United in August 2012. He left the club in March 2013, following injury, having made 14 appearances in all competitions for the club.

By May 2017 he had returned to Jersey Scottish. By August 2018 he was playing for St. Paul's.

In 2019–20 he was playing for the newly formed Jersey Bulls in the Combined Counties Football League Division One.

International career
He was a squad member for Jersey at the 2017 Island Games.

In October 2018, he made his debut for the Parishes of Jersey football team as captain, scoring on his debut as they beat Yorkshire 2–1.

References

1990 births
Living people
Jersey footballers
Southampton F.C. players
Salisbury City F.C. players
Jersey Scottish F.C. players
Airdrieonians F.C. players
St. Paul's F.C. players
Jersey Bulls F.C. players
Scottish Football League players
Association football wingers